The Electrical Safety Foundation International (ESFI), formerly the National Electrical Safety Foundation, is a 501(c)(3) non-profit organization based in Rosslyn, Virginia, US dedicated exclusively to promoting electrical safety at home, school, and in the workplace. Founded in 1994 as a cooperative effort by the National Electrical Manufacturers Association (NEMA), Underwriters Laboratories (UL), and the US Consumer Product Safety Commission (CPSC), ESFI is funded by charitable contributions from, distributors, Nationally Recognized Testing Laboratories, retailers, insurers, utilities, safety organizations, and trade and labor associations. The mission of the Electrical Safety Foundation International (ESFI) is to reduce electrically related injuries, deaths and fires; saving lives and property through public education and outreach.

National Electrical Safety Month 
Each May ESFI commemorates National Electrical Safety Month (NESM) to raise awareness and educate the public on critical electrical safety topics. In many states, governors have issued proclamations to observe National Electrical Safety Month and the Executive Office has taken note with official Presidential recognition beginning in 2014.

Programs
ESFI supports and creates materials to raise awareness on the following consumer hazards and electrical safety technologies required by the National Fire Protection Association's National Electrical Code:

 Ground Fault Circuit Interrupters
 Arc Fault Circuit Interrupters
 Tamper Resistant Receptacles
 Surge Protective Devices
 Electric Shock Drowning
 Counterfeit Electrical Goods
 Fire Prevention

Board Members (2022)

Executive Committee 
 Chair Lorraine Carli, National Fire Protection Association
 Immediate Past Chair Ruppert Russoniello, Eaton Corporation
 Vice Chair Alan Manche, Schneider Electric
 Treasurer Sonia Vahedian, National Electrical Manufacturers Association 
 Secretary Barry Powell, Siemens
 At-Large Member Debra Phillips, National Electrical Manufacturers Association

Directors 

 Scott Bausch, Pass & Seymour
 Joy Ditto, American Public Power Association
 Milan Dotlich, UL (Underwriters Laboratories)
 Marco Giamberadino, National Electrical Contractors Association
 Matt Hockman, Eaton Corporation
 Steve Jackson, ILSCO
 Thayer Long, Independent Electrical Contractors
 Nelson Squires, WESCO Distribution
 Stephanie Voyda, Edison Electric Institute
 Richard Weiser, CSA Group

Board Liaisons
Andrew Trotta, US Consumer Product Safety Commission

References

External links
ESFI website

electrical manufacturers
Electrical safety
Non-profit organizations based in Arlington, Virginia